Andrea Salvietti (born March 25, 1952) is an Italian sprint canoer who competed in the mid-1970s. He was eliminated in the repechages of the K-4 1000 m event at the 1976 Summer Olympics in Montreal.

References
Sports-Reference.com profile

1952 births
Canoeists at the 1976 Summer Olympics
Italian male canoeists
Living people
Olympic canoeists of Italy
Place of birth missing (living people)
20th-century Italian people